Eucithara columbelloides is a small sea snail, a marine gastropod mollusc in the family Mangeliidae.

Description
The length of the shell varies between 6 mm and 10 mm.

Distribution
This marine species occurs off the Philippines and Western Samoa.

References

  Reeve, L.A. 1846. Monograph of the genus Mangelia. pls 1-8 in Reeve, L.A. (ed). Conchologia Iconica. London : L. Reeve & Co. Vol. 3.

External links
  Tucker, J.K. 2004 Catalog of recent and fossil turrids (Mollusca: Gastropoda). Zootaxa 682:1-1295.
 
 MNHN, Paris: Eucithara columbelloides

columbelloides
Gastropods described in 1846